Safely Home is a Christian novel by Randy Alcorn.  It takes place in present-day China, and follows the story of two Harvard roommates, one American and one Chinese, who reunite decades after they graduate.  The novel won the Gold Medallion Book Award for evangelical literature.

Summary
Is this the day I die?

Quan stiffened at the shout behind him. “You meet in the night like the criminals you are. How dare you defy the law? In three minutes we will shoot every man, woman, and child who does not declare himself loyal to the people rather than the gwelios, foreign devils.

American business executive Ben Fielding has no idea what his brilliant old college roommate is facing in China. But when they’re reunited in China after twenty years, the men are shocked at what they discover about each other.

Thrown together in an hour of encroaching darkness, watched by unseen eyes, both must make choices that will determine not only the destinies of two men, but two families, two nations . . . and two worlds.

References

2001 American novels
American Christian novels